The Judge Benjamin Shaver House is a historic house at 701 12th Street in Mena, Arkansas.  It is a -story wood-frame structure, with a hip roof that projects over a two-story porch.  There are further stepped projectings beyond this, culminating in an gable section supported by Ionic columns, with a Palladian window in the pedimented gable end.  The house was built in 1896, two years after Mena was incorporated by Benjamin Shaver, a prominent local lawyer and judge.  The building is further notable for its association with his daughter Dorothy, who parlayed an early career as a dollmaker into becoming CEO of Lord & Taylor.

The house was listed on the National Register of Historic Places in 1979.

See also
National Register of Historic Places listings in Polk County, Arkansas

References

Houses on the National Register of Historic Places in Arkansas
Colonial Revival architecture in Arkansas
Houses completed in 1896
Houses in Polk County, Arkansas
National Register of Historic Places in Polk County, Arkansas